Hailey Hinkley (born October 3, 1996) is an American professional soccer player who plays as a defender.

Early life
Hinkley was born in San Diego, California and raised in the Rancho Peñasquitos neighborhood. She played for the DMCV Sharks in her childhood.

Club career
Hinkley made her NWSL debut on September 12, 2020.

Personal life
Hinkley's older sister, Meagan Harbison, is also a soccer player and is a member of the Dominican Republic women's national team. She is of Irish descent through her father, while her mother is Afro-Dominican.

References

External links
 

1996 births
Living people
Soccer players from San Diego
American women's soccer players
Women's association football defenders
Women's association football forwards
Pepperdine Waves women's soccer players
North Carolina Courage players
National Women's Soccer League players
American people of Irish descent
American sportspeople of Dominican Republic descent
African-American women's soccer players
North Carolina Courage draft picks
21st-century African-American sportspeople
21st-century African-American women